Adriana Poli Bortone (born 25 August 1943) is an Italian politician who was a Member of the European Parliament from 1999 to 2008. She represented Southern Italy. She was mayor of Lecce until 2007.

Biography
Born in Lecce, she became Assistant lecturer in Latin literature at the University of Lecce in 1965. In 1985 she became an associate professor in the same subject.

From 1967 to 1998 she was Member of Lecce Municipal Council and from 1981 to 1990 National secretary for women of the Italian Social Movement. From 1990 to 2000 she also was Member of the national executive of MSI and subsequently of National Alliance.

She was elected for the first time to the Chamber of Deputies in 1983 and in 1994 she was appointed for a month Vice President of the Chamber. In 1994 she also served as Agriculture Minister in the Berlusconi I Cabinet. In 1998 she was elected Mayor of Lecce, and she was re-confirmed in 2002.

In the 1999 European Parliament election she was elected MEP with AN, while in the 2008 general election she was elected to the Senate with The People of Freedom. In 2009 she left the PdL to found her party, named I the South. In the 2013 general election she was candidate for the Senate in Apulia with Great South, but she wasn't re-elected.

In 2014 Adriana Poli Bortone joined Brothers of Italy, but she left the party in 2015, when Forza Italia nominated her for the regional election in Apulia, while FdI decided to support the candidacy of Francesco Schittulli. Finally, she gained the 14% of the votes and she wasn't even elected in the Regional Council. Subsequently, on 29 February 2016, she declared to join Forza Italia.

In 2019 she left Forza Italia and joined the neo-fascist party Tricolour Flame. In 2022 she switched to Italexit, a Eurosceptic party led by journalist Gianluigi Paragone.

External links

 
 
 CV of Adriana Poli Bortone

References

1943 births
Living people
People from Lecce
National Alliance (Italy) MEPs
Tricolour Flame politicians
Forza Italia (2013) politicians
The People of Freedom politicians
National Alliance (Italy) politicians
Italian Social Movement politicians
MEPs for Italy 2004–2009
MEPs for Italy 1999–2004
20th-century women MEPs for Italy
21st-century women MEPs for Italy
Academic staff of the University of Salento
Mayors of Lecce
Women mayors of places in Italy